This is a list of airports in Quebec. It includes all Nav Canada certified and registered water and land airports, aerodromes and heliports in the Canadian province of Quebec.



List of airports and heliports

The list is sorted by the name of the community served; click the sort buttons in the table header to switch listing order.

Defunct airports

See also

List of airports in the Montreal area

References 

 
Quebec
Lists of buildings and structures in Quebec